David Abelson (born 13 February 1975) is a Canadian former professional tennis player. He played in college for  Miami University, competed in the 1997 Maccabiah Games in Israel, and was a Canadian representative at the 1999 Pan American Games in Winnipeg.

Biography
Abelson was a collegiate player for Miami University in 1995-98. He was a MAC Freshman of the Year, and a four-time MAC First Team selection.

He competed for Canada at the 1997 Maccabiah Games in Israel.

Abelson was a Canadian representative at the 1999 Pan American Games in Winnipeg, competing in both singles and doubles. He made the singles second round and the quarter-finals of the doubles.

He won the 1999 Thailand F2 Futures with Australian Ashley Fisher.

In 1999 Abelson was ranked 6th among Canadian men, and in 2000 he was ranked 7th. His hometown at the time was Mont-Royal, Quebec, Canada.

On the professional tour, Abelson made his only ATP Tour main draw appearance at the 2000 Canadian Open, partnering Simon Larose in the doubles event.

ITF Futures titles

Doubles: (1)

References

External links
 
 

1975 births
Living people
Canadian male tennis players
Competitors at the 1997 Maccabiah Games
Jewish Canadian sportspeople
Jewish tennis players
Maccabiah Games tennis players
Maccabiah Games competitors for Canada
Miami RedHawks men's tennis players
People from Mount Royal, Quebec
Tennis players at the 1999 Pan American Games
Pan American Games competitors for Canada
Racket sportspeople from Quebec
20th-century Canadian people
21st-century Canadian people